Moment of Impact is a 1998 American documentary film directed by Julia Loktev.

Premise
The film documents the struggle of Loktev's parents, particularly her mother, following a car accident in 1989 which left Julia's father severely disabled.

Production
The entire film was shot on a Hi8 camera and edited by Loktev.

Reception
For her work, Loktev won the documentary directing award at the 1998 Sundance Film Festival.

References

American documentary films
1998 films
Documentary films about people with disability
1990s American films